Oakers Bog is a 30.7 hectare biological and geological Site of Special Scientific Interest in Dorset, notified in 1988.

Sources

 English Nature citation sheet for the site (accessed 31 August 2006)

External links
 English Nature website (SSSI information)

Sites of Special Scientific Interest in Dorset
Sites of Special Scientific Interest notified in 1988